Catanthera is a genus of flowering plants belonging to the family Melastomataceae.

Its native range is Borneo, New Guinea and Maluku.

Species:

Catanthera brassii 
Catanthera endertii 
Catanthera keris 
Catanthera kinabaluensis 
Catanthera longistylis 
Catanthera lysipetala 
Catanthera multiflora 
Catanthera novoguineensis 
Catanthera nummularia 
Catanthera ovata 
Catanthera paniculata 
Catanthera peltata 
Catanthera pilosa 
Catanthera quintuplinervis 
Catanthera royenii 
Catanthera schlechteri 
Catanthera sleumeri 
Catanthera tawaensis 
Catanthera tetrandra

References

Melastomataceae
Melastomataceae genera